Astral Weeks Live at the Hollywood Bowl: The Concert Film is the second official DVD by Northern Irish singer-songwriter Van Morrison. It was released May 19, 2009 (see 2009 in music). It features the songs from his 1968 classic album, Astral Weeks. The live performances on the DVD were filmed from two separate concerts by Van Morrison at the Hollywood Bowl in Los Angeles, California with a fourteen-member band. The DVD is featured as an Amazon.com Exclusive in the United States with a release date of May 19, 2009.  Morrison also released an album on CD and vinyl on February 24, 2009, entitled Astral Weeks Live at the Hollywood Bowl with material from these two concerts.

Included as a trailer and entitled "To Be Born Again" is an interview conducted by Scott Foundas with Morrison explaining some of the meaning behind Astral Weeks and other footage behind the scenes. Some of the songs on the DVD have new sections that were added during the live performances on stage at the Hollywood Bowl.  As producer of the CD and DVD, Morrison insisted on no post-production engineering so that the sound would be as close as possible to the live concert performances.

Reception 

Mike Clark with USA Today called it:  "A preservation of last year's rhapsodically received Nov. 7 and 8 performances, kinetically photographed and edited for an even more succulent taste."

Track listing for DVD 
All songs, music and arrangements by Van Morrison

 "Astral Weeks – I Believe I've Transcended"
 "Beside You"
 "Slim Slow Slider – I Start Breaking Down"
 "Sweet Thing"
 "The Way Young Lovers Do"
 "Cyprus Avenue – You Came Walking Down"
 "Ballerina – Move On Up"
 "Madame George"
 "Listen to the Lion – The Lion Speaks"

Bonus tracks (2009 DVD release) 
 "Common One"
 "Gloria"

Bonus features 
 To Be Born Again – trailer

Personnel 
 Van Morrison – vocals, guitar, harmonica
 Jay Berliner – guitar
 Tony Fitzgibbon – violin, viola
 Roger Kellaway – grand piano
 David Hayes –  double bass
 Bobby Ruggiero – drums
 Paul Moran – harpsichord, trumpet
 Richie Buckley – flute, saxophone 
 Sarah Jory – 2nd rhythm guitar
 Liam Bradley –  percussion
 Nancy Ellis – violin
 Terry Adams – cello
 Michael Graham –  cello

On the bonus tracks 
 John Platania – guitar (Bonus material only)
 Rick Shlosser – percussion instrument – ("Gloria" only)
 Bianca Thornton – backing vocals (Bonus material only)
 Liam Bradley – backing vocals – ("Gloria" only)
 John Densmore – tambourine ("Gloria" only)

Credits 
 Van Morrison – executive producer
 Gigi Lee – executive producer
 Josh Karchmer – producer
 Darren Doane and Van Morrison – directors

References

Van Morrison video albums
Albums produced by Van Morrison
2009 video albums
Live video albums
2009 live albums
Hollywood Bowl